Lauren Ellis may refer to:

Lauren Ellis (cyclist) (born 1989), New Zealand track cyclist
Lauren Ellis (musician), American blues musician